Anguillian may refer to:

 Something of, from, or related to Anguilla, a British overseas territory in the Caribbean
 Demographics of Anguilla
 Culture of Anguilla
 Anguillian Creole, the language spoken in Anguilla
 Anguillian cuisine

See also 
 

Language and nationality disambiguation pages